The Bhutan women's national football team represents Bhutan in international women's football. The team is controlled by the governing body for football in Bhutan, the Bhutan Football Federation, which is currently a member of the Asian Football Federation and the regional body the South Asian Football Federation. Bhutan play their home games at the national stadium, Changlimithang. It is one of the younger national teams in the world having played its first match in 2010. The team is technically unranked by FIFA as they have been inactive for the last eighteen months, but they will be taking part in the 2014 SAFF Women's Championship at the end of 2014.

2010s

2010

2012

2014

2016

2019

2022

Records

By venue
As at 14 March 2019:

By year
As at 14 March 2019:

By competition
As at 14 March 2019:

By opponent
As at 14 March 2019:

Results
Women's national association football team results